Moja bogda sna is the first solo album of the Bosnian singer Dino Merlin, after five Merlin band albums.

Track listing

 

 Jedna si jedina
Extra song featured on this album is the Republic of BiH wartime national anthem, Jedna si jedina.

References

External links
Moja bogda sna on Dino Merlin's official web site

Dino Merlin albums
1993 albums